Joaquim Francisco de Assis Brasil (29 July 1857 – 24 December 1938) was a Brazilian lawyer, politician, diplomat, writer and poet. He founded the Liberator Party and was a supporter of republicanism. He served as Governor of Rio Grande do Sul in 1891–92 and Ministry of Agriculture in 1911.

Together with the Baron of Rio Branco, he signed the Treaty of Petrópolis, which passed the territory of Acre to Brazilian control after the Acre War. The Acrean municipality of Assis Brasil was named after him.

Assis Brasil also introduced livestock to Brazil, including the Jersey cattle, the Devon cattle, the Karakul sheep and the Arabian horse, and contributed to the improvement of the Thoroughbred.

References

1857 births
1938 deaths
Candidates for President of Brazil
Governors of Rio Grande do Sul
Members of the Chamber of Deputies (Brazil) from Rio Grande do Sul
Ambassadors of Brazil to Argentina
Agriculture ministers of Brazil
Brazilian male poets
19th-century Brazilian poets
19th-century Brazilian male writers
20th-century Brazilian poets
20th-century Brazilian male writers

Republican Party of Rio Grande do Sul politicians
Ambassadors of Brazil to the United States